Origin Records is a jazz and classical music record label founded by drummer John Bishop in 1997. With the help of drummer Matt Jorgensen, Origin expanded its roster of musicians and added the labels OA2 and Origin Classical.

History
Founded in 1997 in Seattle, Washington by John Bishop, with technical help from his former student, New York drummer Matt Jorgensen, the label debuted on the web in 1998. After Jorgensen moved back to Seattle in 2002, the label quickly grew regional, national, and then international.

Origin Records added its sister jazz labels, OA2 Records, in June 2002 and a classical imprint, Origin Classical, in April 2008. In 2009, Origin was named Label of the Year by JazzWeek.

Since 2003, Origin has hosted Seattle's annual Ballard Jazz Festival. The festival was named "Northwest Concert of the Year" by Earshot magazine in 2005 and has featured Sonny Fortune, Chano Dominguez, Gary Bartz, Lee Konitz with the Hal Galper Trio, Matt Wilson, Mike Stern, Bobby Broom, Eric Alexander, the Brian Blade Fellowship, and Joe Locke.

Records
The Origin/OA2 catalog represents over 500 recordings from 300 artists, and releases 30-40 new albums a year.

Origin Records

OA2

Origin Classical

External links
 Official site

References

American record labels
Jazz record labels